The women's 5000 meter at the 2015 KNSB Dutch Single Distance Championships took place in Heerenveen at the Thialf ice skating rink on Sunday 2 November 2014. Although this tournament was held in 2014, it was part of the 2014–2015 speed skating season.

There were 14 participants.

Title holder was Yvonne Nauta.

Result

Source:

References

Single Distance Championships
2015 Single Distance
World